The Gâtine Vendéenne is a historical area in the west of France, around the town of Parthenay in the département of Deux-Sèvres. The area is hilly and wooded, distinguished by small fields and relatively poor land.

Several places in the Gâtine have names deriving from their location, including:
 La Boissière-en-Gâtine
 Mazières-en-Gâtine
 Saint-Paul-en-Gâtine
 Vernoux-en-Gâtine

References

Geography of Deux-Sèvres